Methylopila capsulata is a Gram-negative, aerobic, facultatively methylotrophic, non-spore-forming and motile bacterium species from the genus Methylopila which has been isolated from soil from Tashkent in Uzbekistan.

References

Further reading

External links
Type strain of Methylopila capsulata at BacDive -  the Bacterial Diversity Metadatabase

Methylocystaceae
Bacteria described in 1998